Alyona Andreyevna Khomich (born 26 February 1981), also known as Alena Khomich (from the mis-romanization of her given name), is a Russian retired ice hockey defenseman and former member of the Russian national ice hockey team. A four-time Olympian, she represented Russia at the Winter Olympic Games in 2002, 2006, 2010, and 2014.

International career
At the Winter Olympics in both 2010 and 2006, she scored one assist in five games. In 2002, she did not record a point in five games. She also played in the qualifying tournament for the 2006 Olympics, scoring one point in the two games.

Khomich has also appeared for Russia at nine IIHF Women's World Championships. Her first appearance came in 1999. She was a member of the team that won a bronze medal at the 2001 IIHF Women's World Championship.

Career statistics

International career

References

External links
 
 
 

1981 births
Living people
Ice hockey players at the 2002 Winter Olympics
Ice hockey players at the 2006 Winter Olympics
Ice hockey players at the 2010 Winter Olympics
Olympic ice hockey players of Russia
People from Pervouralsk
Russian women's ice hockey defencemen
HC Agidel Ufa players
HC SKIF players
Sportspeople from Sverdlovsk Oblast